Thomas Darmon (born 12 May 1998) is a French rugby union player whose regular playing position is fly-half and Centre. He currently plays for Montpellier in the French Top 14.

Honours

Montpellier
 Top 14: 2021–22

France U18
 Rugby Europe Under-18 Championship: 2015, 2016

References

External links
Thomas Darmon, MHR profile
Thomas Darmon profile, All rugby

1998 births
Living people
French rugby union players
Rugby union fly-halves
Montpellier Hérault Rugby players